A launch status check, also known as a "go/no go poll" and several other terms occurs at the beginning of an American spaceflight mission in which flight controllers monitoring various systems are queried for operation and readiness status before a launch can proceed. For Space Shuttle missions, in the firing room at the Launch Control Center, the NASA Test Director (NTD) performed this check via a voice communications link with other NASA personnel. The NTD was the leader of the shuttle test team responsible for directing and integrating all flight crew, orbiter, external tank/solid rocket booster and ground support testing in the shuttle launch countdown. The NTD was also responsible for the safety of all personnel inside the pad after external tank loading, including the flight crew, about 10 go/no go reports. He reported to the Launch Director, who has another about 5 go/no go reports. The Launch director declares if a mission is go for launch.

Checklist of firing room positions

Space Shuttle 
OTC – Orbiter Test Conductor Prime
TBC – Tank/Booster Test Conductor and Tank/Booster Test Conductor Prime
PTC – Payload Test Conductor
LPS – Launch Processing System Test Conductors
Houston Flight – Flight Director at the Christopher C. Kraft Jr. Mission Control Center in Houston, TX
MILA – Merritt Island Spaceflight Tracking & Data Network Stations
STM – Support Test Manager
Safety Console – Safety Console Coordinator
SPE – Shuttle Project Engineer
LRD – Landing and Recovery Director
SRO – Superintendent of Range Operations
CDR – Mission Commander (Crew)

Apollo Program

In the Apollo program, the MCC launch status check was initiated by the Flight Director, or FLIGHT. The following "preflight check" order was used before the launch of Apollo 13:
BOOSTER – Booster Systems Engineer (monitored the Saturn V in pre-launch and ascent)
RETRO – Retrofire Officer (responsible for abort procedures and Trans-Earth Injection, or TEI, retrofire burns)
FIDO – Flight Dynamics Officer (responsible for the flight path of the space vehicle)
GUIDANCE – Guidance Officer (monitored onboard navigational systems and onboard guidance computer software)
SURGEON – Flight Surgeon (directs all operational medical activities)
EECOM – Electrical, Environmental, and Consumables Management (monitored cryogenic levels, and cabin cooling/pressure systems; electrical distribution systems)
GNC – Guidance, Navigation, and Control Systems Engineer (responsible for the reaction control system, and CSM main engine)
TELMU – Telemetry, Electrical, and EVA Mobility Unit (lunar spacesuit) Officer
CONTROL – Flight Controller
PROCEDURES – Procedures, or Organization and Procedures Officer (enforced mission policy and rules)
INCO – Integrated Communications Officer
FAO – Flight Activities Officer (checklists, procedures, etc.)
NETWORK – Network (supervised ground station communications)
RECOVERY – Recovery Supervisor (coordinated capsule recovery)
CAPCOM – Capsule Communicator (communicated with the astronauts)

Other/Uncrewed spaceflight 
Varies depending on the type of mission and model of craft, here is one example:
 LCDR - Launch Conductor
 Talker - Person responsible for directing countdown steps as delegated by the Launch Conductor
 Timer- Countdown Clock Operator and person who calls out the T- time 
 QAM - Quality Assurance Monitor 
 SSC - Second Stage Console
 SSP - Second Stage Propulsion
 FSC - First Stage Console
 Prop 1 - Propulsion 1st Stage #1
 Prop 2 - Propulsion 1st Stage #2
 TSC - Third Stage Console
 MCE - Missile Chief Engineer
 PTO - Propulsion Telemetry Observer
 TM-1 - Telemetry Monitor 1st Stage
 TM-2 - Telemetry Monitor 2nd Stage
 LWO - Launch Weather Officer
 AFLC - Air Force Launch Conductor
 LD - Launch Director

See also

 Spaceflight
 Space launch
 Launch vehicle
 Mission control center
 Launch Control Center
 Spacecraft
 List of human spaceflights
 List of launch vehicles
 Timeline of spaceflight
 Space exploration
 Space logistics
 Spacecraft propulsion

References

External links

Video recordings 
Endeavour Go For Launch (STS-123)
STS-122 Go/No Go Poll (STS-122)
STS-115 Atlantis long countdown to launch (launch status check at 3:03) (STS-115)
Space Shuttle STS-114 Launch Final Poll (STS-114)
Go For Launch Part 1 of 2 (2 examples launch director's poll)
Go For Launch Part 2 of 2 (example final readiness poll)
Delta II - ICESat-2 (example Final Readiness Poll)

Text transcripts 
Space Shuttle Launch Countdown (NASA Transcript from 1995)

Spaceflight concepts
Spaceflight
Rocketry